László Görög (born 3 February 1964) is a Hungarian actor as well as voice actor mostly known for his roles in Samba, Argo and Jumurdzsák gyűrűje (Yoomurjak's Ring (2006).

Early life 
Görög was born in Debrecen.

Notable awards 
 Jászai Mari Award (1994)
 Napsugár-Award (2004)

Movie roles 
 Akli Miklós (1986)
 Laura (1987)
 Forget about me (1990)
 Homo Novus (1990)
 Szamba (1995)
 Szeressük egymást, gyerekek – A nagy agyhalál (1995)
 Franciska vasárnapjai (1996)
 Valami Amerika (2001)
 Max (2002)
 Argo (2004)
 Kész cirkusz (2005)
 Jumurdzsák gyűrűje (2005)
 A herceg haladéka (2006)
 Kútfejek (2006)
 Good (2008)
 Szinglik éjszakája (2010)

Voice actor roles
 For Love or Money (Szenzációs recepciós): Doug Ireland - Michael J. Fox
 Miss Congeniality (Beépített szépség): Eric Matthews - Benjamin Bratt
 Taxi 1-4: Daniel - Samy Naceri
 Baywatch: Eddie Kramer - Billy Warlock
 Falcon Crest: Lance Cumson - Lorenzo Lamas
 The New Adventures of Robin Hood (Robin Hood legújabb kalandjai): Robin Hood - John Bradley
 Tom Jones: Tom Jones - Max Beesley
 Third Watch (Harmadik műszak): Roberto 'Bobby' Caffey - Bobby Cannavale
 Six Feet Under (Sírhant művek): David James Fisher - Michael C. Hall
 Andromeda: Seamus Harper - Gordon Michael Woolvett
 New Street Law (A jog útvesztőjében): Charlie Darling - John Thomson
 Girls in Love (Egy kamaszlány naplója): Dad - Ian Dunn
 Police Academy (Rendőrakadémia) (1.): Carey Mahoney – Steve Guttenberg
 Sherlock BBC: Dr. John Watson - Martin Freeman
 Dragon Hunters (film) (Sárkányvadászok): Gwizdo

External links

 http://port.hu/pls/pe/person.person?i_pers_id=3725

1964 births
Living people
People from Debrecen
Hungarian male voice actors
Hungarian male stage actors
Hungarian male film actors